Arctapodema is a genus of deep-sea hydrozoans in the family Rhopalonematidae.

Species
 Arctapodema ampla Vanhöffen, 1902
 Arctapodema antarctica Vanhöffen, 1912
 Arctapodema australis Vanhöffen, 1902
 Arctapodema macrogaster Vanhöffen, 1902

Invalid species 
 Arctapodema antarcticum (Vanhöffen, 1912) [incorrect gender suffix]
 Arctapodema australe Vanhöffen, 1912 [incorrect spelling]

References

Rhopalonematidae
Hydrozoan genera
Animals described in 1888